The 2003–04 Essex Senior Football League season was the 33rd in the history of Essex Senior Football League a football competition in England.

League table

The league featured 15 clubs which competed in the league last season, along with one new club:
London APSA, joined from the Essex Business Houses League

League table

References

Essex Senior Football League seasons
2003–04 in English football leagues